The  was a form of Catholic devotion used in the medieval Catholic Church when a full Mass could not be said, such as for funerals or marriages which were served in the afternoon after a priest had already said Mass earlier that morning. It consisted of all components the Mass except the Offertory, Consecration and Communion. (Durandus, "Rationale", IV, i, 23)

Specific types of Missa sicca included Missa nautica, said at sea in rough weather, and Missa venatoria, said for hunters in a hurry. In some monasteries each priest was also obliged to say a dry Mass after the conventual Mass. 

Cardinal Giovanni Bona (Rerum liturg. libr. duo, I, xv) argued against the practice of saying dry Masses. Following the reform of Pope Pius V it gradually disappeared.

See also
 Viaticum
 Mass of the Presanctified
 Missa bifaciata

References

, s.v. Missa Sicca Sec. D, ¶ 6.

Catholic liturgical rites
Latin religious words and phrases